The 1978–79 Edmonton Oilers season was the Oilers' seventh season of operation. The Oilers placed first and made it to the Avco Cup Final, losing to the Winnipeg Jets. This was the Oilers' last season in the WHA before the merger.

Offseason

Regular season

Final standings

Schedule and results

Playoffs

Edmonton Oilers 4, New England Whalers 3 – Semifinals

Winnipeg Jets 4, Edmonton Oilers 2 – Avco Cup Finals

Player statistics

Note: Pos = Position; GP = Games played; G = Goals; A = Assists; Pts = Points; +/- = plus/minus; PIM = Penalty minutes; PPG = Power-play goals; SHG = Short-handed goals; GWG = Game-winning goals
      MIN = Minutes played; W = Wins; L = Losses; T = Ties; GA = Goals-against; GAA = Goals-against average; SO = Shutouts;

Awards and records

Transactions

Farm teams

See also
1978–79 WHA season

References

External links

Ed
Ed
Edmonton Oilers seasons